The Carpetbaggers is a 1964 American drama film directed by Edward Dmytryk, based on the best-selling 1961 novel The Carpetbaggers by Harold Robbins and starring George Peppard as Jonas Cord, a character based loosely on Howard Hughes, and Alan Ladd in his last role as Nevada Smith, a former Western gunslinger turned actor. The supporting cast features Carroll Baker as a character extremely loosely based on Jean Harlow as well as Martha Hyer, Bob Cummings, Elizabeth Ashley, Lew Ayres, Ralph Taeger, Leif Erickson, Archie Moore and Tom Tully.

The film is a landmark of the sexual revolution of the 1960s, venturing further than most films of the period with its heated sexual embraces, innuendo, and sadism between men and women, much like the novel, where "there is sex and/or sadism every 17 pages".

Plot

Jonas Cord Jr. becomes one of America's richest men in the early twentieth century, inheriting an explosives company from his late father. Cord buys up all the company stock and pays off his father's young widow, Rina Marlowe.
Cord becomes an aviation pioneer and his wealth grows. He destroys a business rival named Winthrop, then seduces and marries the man's daughter Monica, only to abandon her when she wants to settle down and have a home and children. Monica hangs on for years, aware of Cord's troubled youth, hoping he'll come back to her. In order to force the divorce, he reconnects with his stepmother Rina and begins an affair with her. Crushed, Monica gives Cord his divorce, then discovers she is pregnant with his child. After the birth, Jonas visits her, demanding to know if he is the father. Monica tells him to leave her and their newborn daughter alone.  
Meanwhile, former Cord company stockholder Nevada Smith finds work in western films, becoming a popular cowboy hero. Rina persuades Cord to finance Nevada's project, a script about his former outlaw life, in which he will star. This gives Cord an interest in the second-rate studio that produces Nevada's films, plus creative control over the resulting movie. The film becomes successful despite Cord's constant interference. Rina becomes a big star; her career blossoms while Nevada's declines. To spite Cord, Rina marries Nevada, now considered a has-been.

Rina dies in a drunken car crash and Cord's studio is sold out from under him by Dan Pierce, a renegade employee loyal to the old management. After an alcoholic binge, Cord returns to the studio and builds up a film career for the studio's new discovery, Jennie Denton. Denton and Cord begin an affair and become engaged.

With news of the engagement, Dan Pierce tries to blackmail Jennie with a copy of a pornographic film she made in her youth. Jennie confesses to Cord, who laughs, saying he knows all about her past and that he made her a star in order to have her services all to himself. With her dream of love shattered, Jennie runs out devastated.

Seeing the wreckage of both their lives, Nevada Smith confronts Cord and the two end up in a vicious fist-fight. During the brawl, Nevada forces Cord to confront the mess he has made of his own life and those around him. A contrite Jonas returns to Monica and begs her to take him back. Monica, who has always loved him, forgives him and they embrace.

Cast 
 George Peppard as Jonas Cord
 Alan Ladd as Nevada Smith
 Carroll Baker as Rina Marlowe
 Bob Cummings as Dan Pierce
 Martha Hyer as Jennie Denton
 Elizabeth Ashley as Monica Winthrop
 Lew Ayres as "Mac" McAllister
 Martin Balsam as Bernard B. Norman
 Ralph Taeger as Buzz Dalton
 Archie Moore as Jedediah
 Leif Erickson as Jonas Cord Sr.
 Arthur Franz as Morrissey, airplane designer at Jonas' company
 Tom Tully as Amos Winthrop, Monica's father and Jonas' business rival
 Audrey Totter as Middle-aged prostitute attending to Jonas' week-long drinking binge
 Anthony Warde as Moroni, president of Pioneer National Trust Company of Los Angeles
 Charles Lane as Eugene Denby, Jonas Cord Sr.'s secretary
 Tom Lowell as David Woolf, Bernard Norman's nephew and assistant
 John Conte as Ed Ellis, director of Rina's film at Norman Studio
 Vaughn Taylor as Doctor certifying the death of Jonas Cord Sr.
 Francesca Bellini as Cynthia Randall, Norman's mistress and star at Norman Studio
 Victoria Jean as Jo Ann, daughter of Jonas and Monica

Uncredited (in order of appearance)
Paul Frees as Unseen narrator
Lisa Seagram as Lisa, banker Moroni's beautiful secretary
Peter Duryea as Assistant director in the back of the screening room where Dan Pierce and Nevada Smith are watching one of Nevada's films
Walter Maslow as One of the reporters questioning Jonas and Buzz at the airport
Simon Prescott as One of the reporters questioning Jonas and Buzz at the airport
Ann Doran as One of the reporters questioning Jonas and Buzz at the airport
Joe Turkel as One of the reporters questioning Jonas and Buzz at the airport
James Sikking as One of the reporters questioning Jonas and Buzz at the airport
Don Diamond as Actor portraying saloon gambler on the set of Rina's and Nevada Smith's western
Lynn Borden as Actress portraying saloon girl on the set of Rina's and Nevada Smith's western
Don "Red" Barry as Soundman on the set of Rina's and Nevada Smith's western at Norman studio
Bess Flowers as Woman with "Mac" McAllister at wedding of Nevada and Rina
Virginia Graham as Fictional version of herself, radio reporter who questions Jonas and tells him that Rina just died
Sue Casey as One of Norman's two secretaries who greets Jonas after his purchase of the film studio
Frankie Darro as Hotel bellhop rolling the trolley with Jennie Denton's furs
Walter Reed as Monica's co-worker at her publishing job who hands her the phone with call from Jonas

Production
John Michael Hayes signed to write the script in June 1962. (Soon after, Embassy signed him to adapt Where Love Has Gone.)

Sonny Tufts was a candidate for Nevada Smith. He lost out to Alan Ladd. When Alan Ladd signed to play Nevada Smith, it was also announced that Paramount and Joseph E. Levine would make a prequel about Smith's adventures called Nevada Smith.

Joan Collins, in her autobiography Past Imperfect (1978), says she had a firm offer to play Rina Marlowe but had to decline because of pregnancy.

Robert Cummings was cast as an agent. His wife said "years ago Alfred Hitchcock told him he'd made a great villain with that baby face. It's a wonderful change of pace."

Filming started on June 4, 1963. Carroll Baker had a highly publicized nude scene, shot on a closed set.

Release and reception

Alan Ladd died before the film was released.

The Carpetbaggers premiered in Denver, Colorado on April 9, 1964, and went on to be a large commercial success. It grossed $28,409,547 at the domestic box office, making it the 4th highest-grossing film of 1964. Variety reported that the film earned $13 million in domestic rentals. At the worldwide box office, the film grossed $40,000,000 against a $3 million budget. For her role as Monica, Elizabeth Ashley received BAFTA and Golden Globe nominations for Best Supporting Actress. Due to its success, a prequel was filmed and released two years later. Ladd's part was taken by Steve McQueen.

Bosley Crowther of The New York Times panned the film as "a sickly sour distillation of Harold Robbins's big-selling novel", with the protagonist "a thoroughly mechanical movie puppet, controlled by a script-writer's strings", and Peppard's performance "expressionless, murky and dull." Variety wrote, "Psychological facets of the story are fuzzy, and vital motivational information is withheld to the point where it no longer really seems to matter why he is the miserable critter he is. His sudden reform is little more than an unconvincing afterthought. There's nobody to root for in 'The Carpetbaggers.' And Hayes' screenplay never seems to miss an opportunity to slip in connotations of sex, whether or not they are necessary." Philip K. Scheuer of the Los Angeles Times wrote that the film "is trash, but it has the curiosity pull of a trashy novel. One sits there squirming in the captive presence of its unremitting boldness and bad taste for two-and-a-half hours (it ends again and again and starts up again and again), waiting only for its central figure, Jonas Cord Jr., to be cornered and stomped on like the rat he is. But then we find him, hat in hand, seeking forgiveness and reconciliation from a wronged ex-wife. More—he gets them." Richard L. Coe of The Washington Post described the film as "wild, fruity nonsense" and observed, "At all events, Robbins and Hayes have it beautifully tied up psychologically and all I can say is that I'm glad I never had an insane twin." The film became one of the targets for the negative impact of films on society. Crowther cited the film, along with Kiss Me, Stupid, for giving American movies the reputation of "deliberate and degenerate corruptors of public taste and morals".

The movie was one of the 13 most popular films in the UK in 1965. However, many critics frowned upon the film, considering it to be "vulgar and tasteless" or "an upscale dirty movie". The Monthly Film Bulletin stated, "They don't make movies like this any more—or at least, like The Carpetbaggers should have been. Dmytryk does a very clean, efficient job of direction, interweaving the various strands of his complicated story with exemplary clarity, but somehow there is an element missing: the film is big, bold, sprawlingly epic and all that, but it never manages to carry off its outrageous silliness with any of the flourish of the good old days." Mad magazine lampooned the film in issue #92 with The Carpetsweepers.

The theme tune by Elmer Bernstein was recorded in a version by Jimmy Smith arranged by Lalo Schiffrin. This version was used to accompany the titles and credits for the UK BBC 2 The Money Programme, a finance and current affairs television magazine program.

Soundtrack
Elmer Bernstein re-recorded his music for the movie as an album on Ava Records. In 2013 Intrada Records issued the complete original soundtrack on CD, pairing it with the CD premiere of the Ava re-recording (tracks 22-31).

 Seal / Main Title 2:26 
 A Maverick 0:52 
 Rina's Record 3:32
 The Forbidden Room 2:42 
 Sierra Source (Alternate) 1:41
 Sierra Source 2:39
 Separate Trails 2:03
 Monica's Shimmy 0:31
 Lots of Lovely Ceilings 2:02 
 Nevada's Trouble 7:12 
 Get a Divorce 1:35 
 Movie Mogul 0:35 
 Two of a Kind 5:11
 Sierra Source Pt. 2 2:14 
 Rina's Dead 1:02 
 Speak of the Devil 1:29 
 New Star 3:05 
 Bad Bargain 0:51 
 Jonas Hits Bottom 5:40 
 Finale 1:26
 Love Theme from The Carpetbaggers 3:10 
 The Carpetbaggers 2:31 
 Love Theme from The Carpetbaggers 2:40 
 Speak of the Devil 2:01 
 Forbidden Room 2:19 
 The Carpetbagger Blues 3:52 
 Main Title from The Carpetbaggers 2:10 
 New Star 2:16 
 The Producer Asks for a Divorce 2:39 
 Jonas Hits Bottom 2:50 
 Finale 1:44

See also
List of American films of 1964

Notes

References

External links

 
 
 
 
 

1964 films
1964 drama films
American aviation films
American drama films
American business films
Embassy Pictures films
Films scored by Elmer Bernstein
Films about film directors and producers
Films based on American novels
Films directed by Edward Dmytryk
Films set in the 1920s
Films set in the 1930s
Films set in Los Angeles
1960s business films
Obscenity controversies in film
Films à clef
1960s English-language films
1960s American films